This is a list of episodes for Fast N' Loud Season 10. Season 10 started on December 29, 2015.

References 

2015 American television seasons
2016 American television seasons